Winifred Lydia Caunden Sargent (8 May 1905 – October 1979) was an English mathematician. She studied at Newnham College, Cambridge and carried out research into Lebesgue integration, fractional integration and differentiation and the properties of BK-spaces.

Early life 

Sargent was born into a Quaker family, daughter of Henry Sargent and Edith, his second wife, growing up in Fritchley, Derbyshire. She attended Ackworth School, a private school for Quakers, from 1915 to 1919. She then won a scholarship to attend The Mount School, York, another Quaker school, and later the Herbert Strutt School. In 1923, while there, she won a Derby scholarship, a State Scholarship, and a Mary Ewart scholarship to attend Newnham College, Cambridge and study mathematics in 1924.

While at Newnham she won further awards: an Arthur Hugh Clough Scholarship in 1927, a Mary Ewart Travelling Scholarship and a Goldsmiths Company Senior Studentship both in 1928. She graduated with a First class degree and remained at Cambridge conducting research but was unsatisfied by her progress and left to teach mathematics at Bolton High School.

Academic career 
Sargent's first publication was in 1929, On Young's criteria for the convergence of Fourier series and their conjugates, published in the Mathematical Proceedings of the Cambridge Philosophical Society. In 1931 she was appointed an Assistant Lecturer at Westfield College and became a member of the London Mathematical Society in January 1932. in 1936 she moved to Royal Holloway, University of London, at the time both women's colleges. In 1939 she became a doctoral student of Lancelot Bosanquet, but World War II broke out, preventing his formal supervision from continuing. In 1941 Sargent was promoted to lecturer at Royal Holloway, moving to Bedford College in 1948. She served on the Mathematical Association teaching committee from 1950 to 1954. In 1954 she was awarded the degree of Sc.D. (Doctor of Science) by Cambridge and was given the title of Reader. While at the University of London she supervised Alan J. White in 1959.

Bosanquet started a weekly seminar in mathematics in 1947, which Sargent attended without absence for twenty years until her retirement in 1967. She rarely presented at it, and did not attend mathematical conferences, despite being a compelling speaker.

Mathematical results 

Much of Sargent's mathematical research involved studying types of integral, building on work done on Lebesgue integration and the Riemann integral. She produced results relating to the Perron and Denjoy integrals and Cesàro summation. Her final three papers consider BK-spaces or Banach coordinate spaces, proving a number of interesting results.

For example, her 1936 paper proves a version of Rolle's theorem for Denjoy–Perron integrable functions using different techniques from the standard proofs: 

Her 1953 paper established several important results on summability kernels and is referenced in two textbooks on functional analysis. Her papers in 1950 and 1957 contributed to fractional integration and differentiation theory.

In her obituary, her work is described as being:

Papers

Notes

References 

English mathematicians
1905 births
1979 deaths
Women mathematicians
20th-century British women scientists
Alumni of Newnham College, Cambridge
People from Amber Valley
People educated at Ackworth School
People educated at The Mount School, York
Academics of Royal Holloway, University of London
Academics of Bedford College, London